The Open Air Theatre, Barra Hall Park, Hayes is a purpose-built outdoor theatre with concrete-step seating for up to 180 people. Originally built in 1951, the structure fell into disrepair and was rebuilt in steel in 2005.

Type
The Open Air Theatre in Barra Hall Park is a modern, steel-built structure. Four steel umbrellas simultaneously give protection to the stage and reflect sound towards the audience. The stage backdrop is made up of vertical sheets of steel. The indoor back-stage area has toilets and two small dressing rooms.

History
The original Open Air Theatre in Barra Hall Park, Hayes was built in 1951 as a community venue for music, theatre and dance. Over time, the structure fell into disrepair, and the local community raised funds for its reconstruction. The 2005 steel-rebuild was designed by architects Angela Brady (now president of the Royal Institute of British Architects) and Robin Mallalieu, whose aim for a theatre which would have sculptural and visual interest even when not in use produced a theatre with an abstract, enigmatic quality.

Standout productions include performances of Shakespeare's The Tempest (2004) and Hotbuckle Productions' 2015 adaptation of Jane Austen's Persuasion.

Transport

Buses
The 195 and H98 stop near Barra Hall Park on Church Road, and the U4 stops near the park at Barra Hall Circus. Hayes town centre is approximately 1 km away, with its many other regular bus services.

Train
The closest train station is Hayes & Harlington, which is a little over 1 km walk away.

Car
On-site parking is available. Street parking (Park and Pay) may be found on the surrounding roads near to the entrances.

References

External links
 1960s view of Open Air Theatre, Barra Hall Park

Theatres in the London Borough of Hillingdon